Johannes "Johs" Harviken (born 6 April 1943) is a retired Norwegian cross-country skier. He won two medals at the 1972 Winter Olympics in Sapporo with a silver in the 4 × 10 km relay and a bronze in the 30 km.

Harviken had his first skiing success when he placed third over 15 km at the 1967 national championships. Later he won the national 30 km title in 1970 and finished second in the 50 km race at the 1969 Holmenkollen ski festival. He retired after failing to qualify for the 1976 Winter Olympics and later worked as a carpenter.

Cross-country skiing results
All results are sourced from the International Ski Federation (FIS).

Olympic Games
 2 medals – (1 silver, 1 bronze)

References

External links

1943 births
Norwegian male cross-country skiers
Olympic cross-country skiers of Norway
Olympic silver medalists for Norway
Olympic bronze medalists for Norway
Cross-country skiers at the 1972 Winter Olympics
Living people
Olympic medalists in cross-country skiing
Medalists at the 1972 Winter Olympics
20th-century Norwegian people